Mike Wolfe is a former politician. He was the first directly elected mayor of Stoke-on-Trent, sitting in office from 2002 to 2005.  He was formerly employed as the manager of the Citizens Advice Bureau in the city.

Career

Time as Mayor
Wolfe left the Labour Party to stand as an independent in the mayoral race of October 2002 and narrowly beat George Stevenson, a local Labour member of Parliament. Both Wolfe and his successor Mark Meredith are openly gay.

Wolfe came third out of eight in his bid for re-election in May 2005 when Labour gained the position of elected mayor. The election was notable for a record number of spoiled ballot papers.

Post-2005
He later became a columnist for a local paper, The Sentinel.

References

Year of birth missing (living people)
Living people
Independent politicians in England
Mayors of Stoke-on-Trent
LGBT mayors of places in the United Kingdom
English LGBT politicians
Gay politicians